Steve Lacy is a two-time American Olympic athlete. He was born and raised in McFarland, Wisconsin. He went to college at the University of Wisconsin–Madison where he was the first UW runner to break the 4-minute mile.

References

American male long-distance runners
Living people
People from McFarland, Wisconsin
Track and field athletes from Wisconsin
Wisconsin Badgers men's track and field athletes
Year of birth missing (living people)
Olympic track and field athletes of the United States
Athletes (track and field) at the 1984 Summer Olympics
20th-century American people